The Parrish Dart is an American canard-configuration homebuilt aircraft that was designed by Jimmy R. Parrish and produced by Parrish Aircraft Xperimental, Inc. of Plantation, Florida. It first flew in the Autumn of 1995. When it was available the aircraft was supplied in the form of plans for amateur construction.

Design and development
The Parrish Dart started in 1983 as a delta-winged design, but was developed into a canard configuration resembling a Rutan Long-EZ. It features a cantilever mid-wing, a two-seats-in-tandem enclosed cockpit under a bubble canopy, fixed tricycle landing gear main gear with a retractable nosewheel and a single engine in pusher configuration.

The aircraft is made from fiberglass, with the fuselage a fibreglass sandwich and the wings and canard built from fibreglass spars and solid-core fibreglass airfoil shapes cut with a hot-wire foam cutter. The cockpit features a side-stick at both seat positions and a right-mounted console. Rudder pedals and brakes are only fitted for the front seat. The standard engine used is the  Volkswagen air-cooled engine.

The designer estimated the construction time from the supplied plans as 1500 hours.

Operational history
By 1998 the company reported that one aircraft had been completed and was flying.

In April 2015 only one example, the prototype, was registered in the United States with the Federal Aviation Administration.

Specifications (Dart)

References

External links
Photo of the Parrish Dart

Dart
1990s United States sport aircraft
1990s United States ultralight aircraft
1990s United States civil utility aircraft
Single-engined pusher aircraft
Mid-wing aircraft
Homebuilt aircraft
Canard aircraft
Aircraft first flown in 1995